The 1973–74 Atlanta Flames season was the second season for the franchise.

Regular season

Season standings

Schedule and results

Playoffs
The Flames made the playoffs for the first time in franchise history in 1973–74, as they finished in fourth place in the West Division, setting up a first round playoff matchup against the first place Philadelphia Flyers.  The Flyers finished the season with a 50–16–12 record, earning 112 points, which was 38 more points than Atlanta.

The best of seven series opened up at the Spectrum in Philadelphia in front of a sellout crowd of 17,007, and the Flyers opened the scoring with four seconds remaining in the first period, when Gary Dornhoefer scored a shorthanded goal.  The Flyers extended their lead to 2–0 in the second period after Tom Bladon scored on the powerplay.  In the third period, Orest Kindrachuk gave Philadelphia a 3–0 lead, however, thirty seconds later, Bob Murray scored the first ever playoff goal for Atlanta, cutting the lead to 3–1.  Orest Kindrachuk added a second goal later in the third to give the Flyers a 4–1 opening game victory.  Bernie Parent made 31 saves for the victory, while Phil Myre took the loss for Atlanta.

In the second game of the series, the Flyers took an early 1–0 lead on a goal by Terry Crisp.  In the second period, Rick MacLeish scored a natural hat-trick, scoring three goals in a row, to give the Flyers a 4–0 lead.  Rey Comeau broke the Flyers shutout bid in the third period, however, Jimmy Watson scored for Philadelphia, as the Flyers won the second game 5–1, taking a 2–0 series lead.

The series shifted to the Omni Coliseum for the third game, as the arena was sold out with 15,141 fans for the first ever playoff game in Atlanta.  The Flyers opened the scoring with two quick goals in the first period, as Don Saleski and Bobby Clarke scored in the first 5:02 of the game to give Philadelphia a 2–0 lead.  In the second period, Larry Romanchych responded for the Flames, cutting the lead to 2–1, however, the Flyers regained their two-goal lead when Rick MacLeish scored his fourth goal of the series.  In the third period, Bill Barber scored for the Flyers, as they took the third game 4–1, and now had a 3–0 series lead.

In the fourth game, facing elimination, and in front of another sold out crowd, the Flames opened the scoring 3:28 into the game, when Larry Romanchych beat Bernie Parent to give Atlanta a 1–0 lead, their first lead of the series.  In the second period, the Flames took a 3–0 lead, after goals by Jean Lemieux and Rey Comeau, however, the Flyers Andre Dupont scored a late period goal to cut the Flames lead to 3–1.  Early in the third period, the Flyers Gary Dornhoefer scored on the powerplay to make the score 3–2.  On another powerplay, Tom Bladon scored for Philadelphia, tying the game at 3–3.  The game went into overtime, and the Flyers completed the comeback, when Dave Schultz beat Phil Myre, as the Flyers won the game 4–3, and eliminated the Flames from the post-season

Philadelphia Flyers 4, Atlanta Flames 0

Player statistics

Skaters
Note: GP = Games played; G = Goals; A = Assists; Pts = Points; PIM = Penalty minutes

†Denotes player spent time with another team before joining Atlanta.  Stats reflect time with the Flames only.
‡Traded mid-season

Goaltending
Note: GP = Games played; TOI = Time on ice (minutes); W = Wins; L = Losses; OT = Overtime/shootout losses; GA = Goals against; SO = Shutouts; GAA = Goals against average

Transactions
The Flames were involved in the following transactions during the 1973–74 season.

Trades

Free agents

Claimed off waivers

Intra-league Draft

NHL Amateur Draft

References
 Flames on Hockey Database

Atlanta
Atlanta
Atlanta Flames seasons